FC Vysočina Jihlava is a football club from Jihlava, Czech Republic, which currently plays in the Czech National Football League, after relegated from the Czech First League, the top football competition in the Czech Republic in 2017–18 season. Jihlava played in the top flight for the first time in its history in the 2005–06 season. The club has taken part in the Czech 2. Liga more than 10 times and has also played in the Czech First League.

History

The club was founded under the name PAL Jihlava in 1948. After the Czech Republic became independent in 1993, the club played in the third-tier Bohemian Football League until promotion in 2000 to the Czech 2. Liga. The club went on to take part in the second division for five years, reaching the semi-finals of the Czech Cup in 2003–04 and winning promotion to the top flight after finishing second in the 2004–05 Czech 2. Liga. Jihlava played in the top flight for the first time in their history in 2005–06, being relegated back to the second league on the last day of the season, after a loss at home against Slavia Prague. Following another spell in the second league, this time of six years, the club won back a place in the top flight having finished second in the 2011–12 Czech 2. Liga.

Historical names
 1948–49 – PAL Jihlava
 1949–53 – Sokol Motorpal Jihlava
 1953–93 – Spartak Jihlava
 1993–95 – Spartak PSJ Jihlava
 1995–97 – PSJ Motorpal Jihlava (merger with SK Jihlava)
 1997–00 – FC PSJ Jihlava
 Since 2000 – FC Vysočina Jihlava

Stadium

Jihlava play home matches at the Stadion v Jiráskově ulici, which boasts a 4,082 all-seater capacity. The club undertook major reconstruction each time the club was promoted to the Czech First League, in 2005 and 2012, in order for the stadium to meet league criteria. The stadium features two main stands for the crowd (sectors A and B), while the away fans are catered for with 229 seats behind one of the goals (sector D). The remaining side, sector C, is reserved for VIP guests.

Players

Current squad
.

Out on loan

Notable former players

Managers

 Tibor Duda (June 1999 – June 2000)
 Miloslav Machálek (July 2000 – September 2002)
 Roman Pivarník (October 2002 – July 2003)
 Jaroslav Netolička (July 2003 – June 2004)
 Karel Večeřa (July 2004 – June 2006)
 Milan Bokša (June 2006 – June 2007)
 Luboš Zákostelský (July 2007 – September 2007)
 Karol Marko (September 2007 – June 2009)
 Luboš Urban (July 2009 – March 2011)
 Roman Pivarník (July 2011 – June 2012)
 František Komňacký (May 2012 – December 2013)
 Petr Rada (December 2013 – September 2014)
 Roman Kučera (September 2014 – December 2014)
 Luděk Klusáček (December 2014 – September 2015)
 Milan Bokša (September 2015 – January 2016)
 Michal Hipp (January 2016 – September 2016)
 Michal Bílek (September 2016 – April 2017)
 Josef Jinoch (April 2017 – June 2017)
 Ivan Kopecký (June 2017 – December 2017)
 Martin Svědík (December 2017 – November 2018)
 Radim Kučera (December 2018 – July 2020)
 Aleš Křeček (July 2020 – June 2021)
 Jan Kameník (June 2021 – Oct 2022)
 Ondřej Smetana (October 2022 – present)

History in domestic competitions

 Seasons spent at Level 1 of the football league system: 6
 Seasons spent at Level 2 of the football league system: 14
 Seasons spent at Level 3 of the football league system: 7
 Seasons spent at Level 4 of the football league system: 0

Czech Republic

References

External links
 

 
Football clubs in the Czech Republic
Association football clubs established in 1948
Czech First League clubs
Sport in Jihlava